Mainland Air is a general aviation, flight training and air charter company operating out of Dunedin International Airport in New Zealand.

History
Mainland Air was established in 1991 by Queenstown businessman Christopher Kelliher. From 1995 to 2006 the airline operated courier flights for New Zealand Post between Dunedin and Christchurch. Later in 2007 the airline started a thrice weekly Dunedin to Alexandra and Queenstown service using a ten-seater Piper Chieftain. In March 2008 Mainland started a thrice weekly Dunedin to Invercargill service also using its Piper Chieftain aircraft. At that time Mainland were also considering services to Wanaka and Te Anau.
Later all these scheduled services were dropped due to lack of demand. Late 2009 Chris Kelliher sold the company to the Paterson family who owned Mainland's major maintenance provider, Southair Ltd 
In 2013 Mainland Air was sold to Phil and Shirley Kean, respectively the long time Chief Pilot and General Manager. Mainland operates two Piper Chieftain twin engine aircraft for charter and air ambulance duties, a fleet of Cessna 152 aircraft for pilot training, two Piper Seneca twin engine aircraft for charter and multi-engine instrument training and a twin engine Tecnam aircraft for pilot training.

Services

Mainland Air Services provides charter flights throughout New Zealand. Its scenic flights visit popular destinations such as Milford Sound,  Mount Aspiring/Tititea, Aoraki/Mount Cook, Fiordland, Omarama, Stewart Island/Rakiura, Taiaroa Heads and the Queenstown area. As well as operating air ambulance transfer flights, Mainland Air provides charter flights for medical specialists from Dunedin to Invercargill and Alexandra several times per week on behalf of the Southern District Health Board.

Mainland Air also operates a flying training school, called Mainland Aviation College.

A scheduled service began on 4 June 2014 linking Oamaru and Christchurch using Piper Chieftain aircraft. This service ended due to lack of patronage three months later.

Flights linking Timaru and Wanaka to Christchurch, and Oamaru to Wellington have also been discussed.

Fleet

Mainland Air operates the following aircraft:

See also 

 Air transport in New Zealand
 List of airlines of New Zealand
List of general aviation operators of New Zealand

References

External links

 Mainland Air (official website)

Airlines of New Zealand